The 1991 Dubai Duty Free Classic was a professional ranking snooker tournament that took place in October 1991 at the Al Nasr Stadium in Dubai, United Arab Emirates.

John Parrott won the tournament, defeating Tony Knowles 9–3 in the final.


Main draw

References

Dubai Classic
Dubai Classic
Dubai Classic
Dubai Classic